Luka Dumančić (born 27 October 1998) is a Croatian football player who plays for Rudeš.

Club career
Dumančić started practicing football at GOŠK Kaštel Gomilica, moving on to the youth system of Hajduk Split at the age of 11. Not retained by the club at the age of 19, he joined Italian Serie D club Albalonga for the 2017-2018 season.

On 13 July 2018, he signed a 2-year contract with Lecce, newly promoted to Serie B.

After appearing on the bench for Lecce in two Coppa Italia games, on 12 August 2018 he was loaned to Serie C club Juve Stabia. He made his professional Serie C debut for Juve Stabia on 24 November 2018 in a game against Rieti. He started the game and was substituted at half-time. He finished the loan with 3 appearances, 2 of them as a starter.

As he returned to Lecce from loan, the club was promoted again. In the 2019–20 Serie A season, he appeared on the bench for Lecce on several occasions, but did not see any time on the field.

On 7 January 2020, he was loaned to a Serie C club once again, this time to Gozzano.

In late September 2022, following a season-long stint at the now-defunct Inter Zaprešić, Dumančić signed for NK Rudeš.

References

External links
 

1998 births
Living people
Footballers from Split, Croatia
Association football defenders
Croatian footballers
Croatia youth international footballers
U.S. Lecce players
S.S. Juve Stabia players
A.C. Gozzano players
S.S.D. Lucchese 1905 players
NK Inter Zaprešić players
CS Concordia Chiajna players
NK Rudeš players
Serie C players
Serie D players
First Football League (Croatia) players
Croatian expatriate footballers
Expatriate footballers in Italy
Croatian expatriate sportspeople in Italy